The Achepabanca River is a tributary of the Mégiscane River, flowing into the north-eastern part of Senneterre, in La Vallée-de-l'Or Regional County Municipality (RCM), in the administrative region of Abitibi-Témiscamingue, in Quebec, in Canada.

The course of the river successively crosses the townships of Maricourt, Charrette and Girouard (on the border of the canton Berthelot).

The Achepabanca River runs entirely on forest land north-east of the La Vérendrye Wildlife Reserve and on the west side of Gouin Reservoir. Forestry is the main economic activity of this hydrographic slope; recreational tourism activities, second. The surface of the river is usually frozen from the beginning of December to the end of April. The hydrographic slope of the Achepabanca River is served by some forest roads.

Geography

Toponymy
The toponym "Achepabanca River" was formalized on December 5, 1968, at the Commission de toponymie du Québec.

See also

References

External links 

La Vallée-de-l’Or
Rivers of Abitibi-Témiscamingue
Nottaway River drainage basin